Ornduffia umbricola, also known as the lax marsh-flower, is a species of plant in the Menyanthaceae family of wetland plants that is endemic to Australia. There are two recognised varieties.

Varieties
 Ornduffia umbricola var. umbricola (Aston) Tippery & Les
 Ornduffia umbricola var. beaugleholei (Aston) Tippery & Les

Description
The species is a slender, tufted, perennial (occasionally annual) herb that grows up to 105 cm in height. The round leaves are 1–12 cm across. The yellow flowers are 11–31 mm in diameter with 4–6 (usually 5) lobes. The seed capsules are 5–11 mm long. The flowers and fruits appear mainly from November to April.

Distribution and habitat
The species occurs in western Victoria, south-eastern South Australia and Tasmania. It is found in semi-shaded sites on damp sandy or peaty soils, or in shallow freshwater wetlands, sometimes in water up to 45 cm deep.

References

umbricola
Asterales of Australia
Flora of South Australia
Flora of Victoria (Australia)
Flora of Tasmania
Taxa named by Helen Isobel Aston
Plants described in 1969